Truman may refer to:

People
 Truman (surname)
 Harry S. Truman (1884–1972), 33rd U.S. president
 Truman (given name)
Truman Capote (1924–1984), American writer and actor

Media
Truman (book), a biography of Harry S. Truman by David McCullough
Truman (1995 film), 1995 film based on the book by McCullough
Truman (2015 film), 2015 Spanish-Argentine film

Places in the United States 
 Truman, Minnesota, a city
 Truman, Pennsylvania, an unincorporated community
 Truman, Wisconsin, an unincorporated community

Other uses 
Truman's Brewery, a former London's famous brewery closed in 1989
Truman High School (disambiguation)
Truman Sports Complex, Kansas City, Missouri, USA
Truman State University, Missouri, USA
USS Harry S Truman (CVN-75)
The Truth about Truman School, a 2008 children's book by Dori Hillestad Butler

See also

Truman House (disambiguation)
Trumann, Arkansas